SR90 could refer to :

 State Route 90 - See List of highways numbered 90
 Strontium-90